Tantōjutsu (短刀術) is a Japanese term for a variety of traditional Japanese knife fighting systems that used the tantō (短刀), a knife or dagger.  Historically, many women used a version of the tantō, called the kaiken, for self-defense, but warrior women in pre-modern Japan learned one of the tantōjutsu arts to fight in battle.

Martial arts that practise tantōjutsu
Tantō with blunt wooden or plastic blades are used to practice martial arts. Metal blades can be used in more advanced training and in demonstrations. Styles that use tantō:

Budō (Gendai):
 Aikido
 Shorinji Kempo

Bugei:
 Yanagi-ryu Aiki Bugei
 Ogawa-ryu Bugei

Bujutsu (Koryū):
 Kashima Shin-ryū (this ryūha uses term Kaikenjutsu)
 Takamura-ha Shindo Yoshin-ryu

See also
 Kaiken (dagger)
 Wakizashi

Japanese martial arts
Japanese martial arts terminology
Blade weapons